The Eyre Developmental Road is a gazetted road in south-west Queensland that runs from Bedourie to Birdsville and then to the border with South Australia, where it continues as the Birdsville Track. At the northern end it joins the Diamantina Developmental Road, and the mostly unsealed road crosses the Georgina River and Diamantina River. Maintenance of the road is the responsibility of the Queensland State Government. The road intersects with the Birdsville Developmental Road in Birdsville.

Upgrades

Pave and seal
A project to pave and seal  of road south of Bedourie, at a cost of $10 million, was expected to complete in early 2022.

References

Roads in Queensland
Highways in Queensland